Kouroulamini is a commune in the Cercle of Bougouni in the Sikasso Region of southern Mali. The principal town lies at N'Tentou. In 1998 the commune had a population of 3,128.

References

Communes of Sikasso Region